Notable recordings of Johann Sebastian Bach's St Matthew Passion (Matthäus-Passion) are shown below in a sortable table.

History 

The earliest recordings of the St Matthew Passion were released on 78 records, although this medium was problematic for such a long work, because the discs only offered about 5 minutes per side.
The first recording of the work was conducted by David McKinley Williams with the choir of St. Bartholomew's Church, New York in 1930, but it was not complete. There is a live recording of Serge Koussevitzky conducting a complete performance in Boston on Good Friday 1937, sung in English. This has been reissued on CD.

Stereophonic recordings and spatial aspects of the work 
While historic recordings give an opportunity to hear some of the great Bach singers of the past (such as Kathleen Ferrier on the Jacques recording), the introduction of stereophonic sound marked a clear improvement in the musical experience as regards the choral writing. For this complex work, the limited pool of musicians available to Bach in Leipzig was divided between two choirs and orchestras plus a chorus of boy sopranos in the first movement. Choirs 1 and II and the orchestras were physically separated, and the dramatic nature of their interaction puts mono recordings at a disadvantage. In the case of the Karl Münchinger stereo recording from 1964, the engineers not only captured spatial aspects of the performance in the Ludwigsburg Palace, but also made a conscious effort to give a different acoustic to each of three elements of time identified in Picander's libretto, the time-frame being divided into
the Evangelist some years after the events took place
the events of the gospel narrative themselves 
the reflections of the anonymous soloists and the congregation.

Historically informed performance 
The work was first recorded by large choirs and orchestras. From the late 1960s, historically informed performances (HIP) tried to adhere more to the sounds of the composer's lifetime. In his church music generally, and in this work in particular, Bach wrote for boys choirs and for comparatively small orchestras of Baroque instruments (nowadays these instruments, often referred to as "period instruments", are sometimes antiques and sometimes reconstructions).

Historically informed performances set a trend for recordings with smaller groups which is taken to an extreme in recordings using only one voice per part. Some scholars believe that Bach used only one singer for a vocal part in the choral movements, although the number of singers Bach would have deployed continues to be the subject of debate. Recordings with one voice per part are marked OVPP in this discography. On some of these recordings, the solo singer is reinforced in choral movements with a larger orchestra by a ripieno singer (OVPP+R).

Significant recordings 
The selection is taken from the 281 recordings listed on the Bach Cantatas Website as of 2021, beginning with a recording from 1939 by a symphony orchestra and choir to match (the performance conducted by Willem Mengelberg). In 1970 the first HIP recording appeared, conducted by Nikolaus Harnoncourt. The first OVPP recording appeared in 2003, conducted by Paul McCreesh.

Table of recordings 
The sortable listing is taken mostly from the selection provided by Aryeh Oron on the Bach Cantatas Website.

The information lists for one recording typically:
 Conductor / choir / orchestra, often several choirs
 Soloists in the order Evangelist (tenor), Vox Christi (Voice of Jesus, bass), soprano, alto, tenor (if the tenor arias are performed by a different tenor than the evangelist), bass. and some conductors use different soloists in combination with each choir.
 Label
 Year of the recording
 Choir type
 Large choirs (red background): Bach (choir dedicated to Bach's music, founded in the mid of the 20th century), Boys (choir of all male voices), Radio (choir of a broadcaster), Symphony (choir related to a symphony orchestra)
 Medium-size choirs, such as Chamber choir, Chorale (choir dedicated mostly to church music), Madrigal
 One voice per part (green background): OVPP or OVPP+R (with ripienists reinforcing the soloists in some chorale movements)
 Orch. type (orchestra type)
 Large orchestras (red background): Large (unspecified), Bach (orchestra dedicated to Bach's music, founded in the mid of the 20th century), Radio (symphony orchestra of a broadcaster), Opera, Symphony
 Chamber orchestra
 Orchestra on period instruments (green background)
 Notes

References

External links 
 
 
 Libretto with English translation San Francisco Bach Choir
 Matthäus-Passion BWV 244 Commentary, musical examples, list of recordings on the Bach Cantatas Website 
 Side-by-side arrangement of the original text and an English translation Minnesota Public Radio

Discographies of compositions by J. S. Bach